Cyril James Michie (20 August 1900 – 10 November 1966) was an Indian field hockey player who competed in the 1936 Summer Olympics. He was educated at Goethals Memorial School, Kurseong and the team-mate of Joseph Galibardy, who also happens to be an alumnus of Goethals Memorial School.

In 1936 he was a member of the Indian field hockey team, which won the gold medal. He played one match as goaltender. No goals were scored against him.

References

External links
 

1900 births
1966 deaths
Field hockey players from Bihar
Olympic field hockey players of India
Field hockey players at the 1936 Summer Olympics
Indian male field hockey players
Anglo-Indian people
Olympic gold medalists for India
Olympic medalists in field hockey
Medalists at the 1936 Summer Olympics
Indian emigrants to England
British people of Anglo-Indian descent